Shinya Nakazawa (born March 29, 1978) is a Japanese race car driver who competed in Formula Palmer Audi during 1998 and finished 13th in points. 1996 volant elf Winfield Magnycours 2nd position. 1997 Formula Renault Ecurie Winfield. 1998 Formula palmer Audi UK series. 1999 Formula France vice champion(2wins).He has not appeared in a major professional racing series since, and currently works as a racing instructor at the Taki Racing School.

External links
 

Japanese racing drivers
1978 births
Living people
Formula Palmer Audi drivers